The Bosnia and Herzegovina national rugby union team has yet to make its debut at the Rugby World Cup. Bosnia and Herzegovina have been playing international rugby since the early 1990s.

The national side is ranked 89th in the world, as of 16 January 2023.

History

Bosnia and Herzegovina made their international debut in November 1992 in a match against Croatia, losing 3 points to 47. They also played numerous matches during the late 1990s, including fixtures against Croatia, Luxembourg, Slovenia and Hungary before winning their first international in 2000 against Hungary, winning by one point 13-12.

Bosnia and Herzegovina participated in qualifying for the 2003 Rugby World Cup in Australia, competing in Pool B of Round 1 during 2000-01. They finished fifth in their group (winning two games). They also participated in qualifying tournaments for the 2007 Rugby World Cup in France.

Current squad
Squad to 2015 Rugby World Cup – Europe qualification.

World Cup record
 1987 - No qualifying tournament held
 1991-1999 - Did not enter
 2003-2007 - Did not qualify
 2011 - Did not enter

See also
Rugby Union of Bosnia and Herzegovina
Rugby union in Bosnia and Herzegovina
Bosnia and Herzegovina national rugby sevens team
 2003 Rugby World Cup - European qualification
 2007 Rugby World Cup - Europe qualification

References

External links
 Bosnia and Herzegovina on rugbydata.com

Rugby union in Bosnia and Herzegovina
European national rugby union teams
Teams in European Nations Cup (rugby union)